Imperturbatia is a genus of air-breathing land snails, terrestrial pulmonate gastropod mollusks in the family Streptaxidae.

Distribution 
Distribution of the genus Imperturbatia include:
 the Seychelles

Species
Species within the genus Imperturbatia include:
 Imperturbatia violescens (Martens, 1898)

References

Streptaxidae
Taxonomy articles created by Polbot